Zákopčie is a village and municipality in Čadca District in the Žilina Region of northern Slovakia.

The village is a collection of small hamlets spreading through a number of valleys.  The main industries are based on wood harvested from the surrounding woods and forests.  Farming is also important.  There is a post office, village office, a shop, kiosk, a few basic bars, and a florist.  There is also a school.

Many people visit the area for holidays and recreation. With a number of people traveling to bigger towns nearby for work.

History
In historical records the village was first mentioned in 1662.

Geography
The municipality lies at an elevation of 516 metres (1,693 ft) and covers an area of 29.631 km² (76.744 mi²). It has a population of about 1760 people.

External links
http://www.statistics.sk/mosmis/eng/run.html

Villages and municipalities in Čadca District